Euphaedra imperialis, the imperial forester, is a butterfly in the family Nymphalidae. It is found in Nigeria, Cameroon, Gabon, and the Democratic Republic of the Congo.

Description
 
E. imperialis Lindemans. The very beautiful female on which this species is based closely approaches luperca. Whether it is only a form of this or an independent species can only be decided by comparing larger material. Both wings blackish above, the basal part tinged with dark green to beyond the middle; the subapical band of the forewing is about 6 mm. in breadth, bright ochre-yellow, and reaches vein 4, but is then continued by a band running parallel with the distal margin at a distance of about 8 mm.; this band is orange-yellow in cellules 3, 2 and the anterior part of cellule 1 b and bluish at the hindmargin; on the hindwing it is continued by a somewhat narrower blue transverse band nearly to the anal angle; the fringes of the hindwing are pure white; the under surface is light bluish green and marked almost exactly as in luperca , only differing in having the white subapical band of the forewing connected with vein 1 by a white transverse line and in the broad white transverse band of the hindwing being quite straight and hence at vein 4 nearly 9 mm. from the distal margin. The white apical spot of the forewing large on both surfaces. Cameroons

Subspecies
E. i. imperialis (southern Cameroon)
E. i. gabonica Rothschild, 1918 (Nigeria, western Cameroon, Gabon)
E. i. hecqui Darge, 1974 (Nigeria, Cameroon)
E. i. arta Hecq, 1979 (Democratic Republic of Congo: Sankuru)

Biology
The habitat consists of forests.

References

Butterflies described in 1910
imperialis